The Martindale Corn Crib is a historic farm outbuilding in rural northern White County, Arkansas.  It is located west of Letona, in a field near a barn on the south side of Arkansas Highway 310.  The corn crib is a small single-story wooden structure, built out of plank framing on a stone pier foundation, with a gabled metal roof on top.  Built in 1924, it is a rare surviving example of post-and-nailer construction, in which the wall studs are stabilized by a horizontal member halfway up their length.

The building was listed on the National Register of Historic Places in 1992.

See also
 Walls Farm Barn and Corn Crib: NRHP-listed in Lonoke County, Arkansas
 National Register of Historic Places listings in White County, Arkansas

References

Agricultural buildings and structures on the National Register of Historic Places in Arkansas
National Register of Historic Places in White County, Arkansas
1924 establishments in Arkansas
Buildings and structures completed in 1924
Maize production